Cyphoryctis xylodoma is a moth in the family Xyloryctidae, and the only species in the genus Cyphoryctis. The species and genus both were described by Edward Meyrick in 1934 and are found in Tanzania.

References

Xyloryctidae
Xyloryctidae genera
Monotypic moth genera
Taxa named by Edward Meyrick